Fusaro is a surname. Notable people with the surname include:

Chris Fusaro (born 1989), Scottish rugby union player
Magda Fusaro (born 1970), university professor and academic administrator
Roberto Fusaro (born 1968), Italian rower

Italian-language surnames